One Last Dance is a 2006 Singaporean crime film written and directed by Max Makowski and starring Francis Ng, Ti Lung, Vivian Hsu and Harvey Keitel. The film was shown in competition at the 2006 Sundance Film Festival and at the 2006 Cannes Film Festival as part of the "Tous Les Cinemas du Monde Sidebar" before being theatrically released in Singapore on 11 January 2007.

Plot
T (Francis Ng) is Singapore's top class hitman. Every time he receives a red envelope with a name written inside, it means a life will be lost in this world. But he also has his own friendships and romance buried deep inside his heart. Captain (Ti Lung) is T's confidant who plays chess with him by exchanging business cards while Mae (Vivian Hsu), a bartender at TeAmo Bar, is T's beloved.

During a Sunday morning, Mae's olden brother, Ko (Joseph Quek), gives a call to T. Ko was commissioned by his friend Tak to find the son of Italian mafia boss Terrtano (Harvey Keitel). Ko captures three thieves who keep their lips tight and T tortures them to reveal information. After finding Terrtano's son, T kills the three thieves. Unbeknownst to him, one of the thieves is the son of local gang leader, Mr. Sa. Mr. Sa plans to hire T to kill everyone involved in his son's murder, including Ko, Tak, Terranto and even T himself.

Cast
 Francis Ng as T
 Ti Lung as Captain
 Vivian Hsu as Mae
 Harvey Keitel as Terrtano
 Joseph Quek as Ko
 Thomas Lim as Richard
 Sunny Pang as Kai-wing
 Ricky Sim as Nelson
 Wu Kai-Shing as Wong
 Steve Yap as Arthur
 Zhang Wenxiang as Johnathan
 Chen Tianwei as Pui
 Darius Tan as Pei
 Benjamin Yeung as Poi
 Hossan Leong as Treesan
 Zhou Chongqing as Foresan
 Yeo Yann-Yan as Wife
 Quan Xi as Mr. Sa
 Dalton Lau as Red, The Trio #1
 Alan Tay as The Trio #2
 Lawrence Wong as The Trio #3
 Salina Chung as Gu
 Koh Tiang-Choon as Cigarette Vendor
 Boo The Dog as Farting Dog
 Bryan Chen as Sergeant
 Daphne Chia as Ballerina
 Taylor Chia as Ballerina
 Paerin Choa as The Bartender
 Gordan Choy as Guard
 Brendon Fernandez as Muslceman
 Foo Fangrong as Child
 Edric Hsu as Cop
 Thomas Huang as Guard
 Nelson Hui as Child
 Evan Jin as MRT Security Guard
 Koh Ah-Ne as Flower Lady
 Sherry Kuhara as Blond Asian Woman
 Valerie Lee as Ballerina 
 Esther Lim as Ballerina
 Natacia Lim as Child
 Shaun Lim as Child
 Nicole Low as Ballerina
 Poon Kee-Chin as Security Guard
 Reinald Tan as Child
 Tay Kim-Hock as Jo
 Fraser Tong as Child
 Beth Toh as Ballerina
 Cookie Wong as Ballet Teacher
 Henry Wong as Cook
 Wong Keng-Chee as Cook
 Raymond Wong as Asian Elvis
 Raymond Yuen as Cook
 Zee Chia as Model
 Zzren as Rookie Cop

Critical reception
Justin Chang of Variety gave the film a positive review praises lead actor Francis Ng's soulful performance and John Swihart's score. Todd Brown of Screen Anarchy praised the film's clever plotting and Ng's performance, but criticizes the film's humor. Michael Feraro of Film Threat rated the film a score of 2/5 stating the film is "thrown together in the most undesirable fashion."

Awards and nominations

References

External links

One Last Dance at Hong Kong Cinemagic

Singaporean crime films
2006 films
2000s crime films
Chinese-language Singaporean films
2000s Cantonese-language films
2000s Mandarin-language films
Films about contract killing
Films scored by John Swihart
Films set in Singapore
Films shot in Singapore
2000s English-language films
2006 multilingual films
Singaporean multilingual films